The Nation of Islam (NOI) is a religious and political organization founded in the United States by Wallace Fard Muhammad in 1930.
A black nationalist organization, the NOI focuses its attention on the African diaspora, especially on African Americans. While it identifies itself as promoting a form of Islam, its beliefs differ considerably from mainstream Islamic traditions. Scholars of religion characterize it as a new religious movement. It operates as a centralized and hierarchical organization.

The Nation teaches that there has been a succession of mortal gods, each a black man named Allah, of whom Fard Muhammad is the most recent. It claims that the first Allah created the earliest humans, the Arabic-speaking, dark-skinned Tribe of Shabazz, whose members possessed inner divinity and from whom all people of color are descended. It maintains that a scientist named Yakub then created the white race. The whites lacked inner divinity, and were intrinsically violent; they overthrew the Tribe of Shabazz and achieved global dominance. Setting itself against the white-dominated society of the United States, the NOI campaigns for the creation of an independent African American nation-state, and calls for African Americans to be economically self-sufficient and separatist. A millenarian tradition, it maintains that Fard Muhammad will soon return aboard a spaceship, the "Mother Plane" or "Mother Ship," to wipe out the white race and establish a utopia. Members worship in buildings called mosques or temples. Practitioners are expected to live disciplined lives, adhering to strict dress codes, specific dietary requirements, and patriarchal gender roles.

Wallace Fard Muhammad established the Nation of Islam in Detroit. He drew on various sources, including Noble Drew Ali's Moorish Science Temple of America, black nationalist trends like Garveyism, and black-oriented forms of Freemasonry. After Fard Muhammad disappeared in 1934, the leadership of the NOI was assumed by Elijah Muhammad. He expanded the NOI's teachings and declared Fard Muhammad to be the latest Allah. Attracting growing attention in the late 1950s and 1960s, the NOI's influence expanded through high-profile members such as the black nationalist activist Malcolm X and the boxer Muhammad Ali. Deeming it a threat to domestic security, the Federal Bureau of Investigation worked to undermine the group. Following Elijah Muhammad's death in 1975, his son Warith Deen Mohammed took over the organization, moving it towards Sunni Islam and renaming it the World Community of Islam in the West. Members seeking to retain Elijah Muhammad's teachings re-established the Nation of Islam under Louis Farrakhan's leadership in 1977. Farrakhan has continued to develop the NOI's beliefs, for instance by drawing connections with Dianetics, and expanding its economic and agricultural operations.

Based in the United States, the Nation of Islam has also established a presence abroad, with membership open only to people of color. In 2007, it was estimated to have 50,000 members. The Nation has proven to be particularly successful at converting prisoners. The Southern Poverty Law Center and the Anti-Defamation League have accused it of being a black supremacist hate group that promotes racial prejudice towards white people, anti-semitism, and anti-LGBT rhetoric. Muslim critics accuse it of promoting teachings that are not authentically Islamic.

Definition 

The Nation of Islam is a new religious movement, an "ethno-religious movement", and a social movement. Scholars of religion have also classified it as resembling UFO religions, with UFOs featuring in its ideas about the forthcoming end of the world. Although employing the same name, the Nation of Islam has represented two distinct organizations: the first was established by Wallace Fard Muhammad in the 1930s and lasted until 1975, and the second then created by Louis Farrakhan in the late 1970s.

The Nation draws heavily on both Christianity and Islam, although it interprets the Bible and Quran differently from Christians or mainstream Muslims. A black nationalist religion and an African American religion, it seeks to reclaim what it regards as the historic Islamic identity of African Americans. Its members have been called "Black Muslims," and its second leader, Elijah Muhammad, stated that "Islam is the natural religion of the Black Nation." Islamic elements in its practices include the use of the Arabic language, prayers five times a day, and the adoption of a flag based on that of Islamic-majority Turkey. A Muslim identity appealed to the NOI as it offered an alternative to mainstream, Christian-dominated American culture. The Nation denigrates Christianity, regarding it as a tool of white supremacy, and claims that it lacks the rational and scientific basis of its own teachings.

The religion promoted by the Nation has been described as "Fardian Islam," "nontraditional Islam," and "quasi-Islamic". The Nation sees itself as part of the Islamic world, although it has little in common with mainstream forms of Islam. Herbert Berg commented that it had only a "superficial relationship to other Islams" such as the Sunni, Shi'ite and Sufi traditions, while Jason Eric Fishman and Ana Belén Soage observed that although the Nation uses many standard Islamic terms, it gives them "profoundly different meanings" to those understood by most Muslims. The Nation's views differ from the Five Pillars, which are typically seen as central to Islamic belief and practice; its claims that Allah (God) takes anthropomorphic form and that there is no afterlife differ fundamentally from standard Islam. Unlike most forms of Islam, the NOI does not teach that the 6th/7th century Arabian religious leader Muhammad was the final nor the most important messenger of God, instead treating its first two leaders, Fard Muhammad and Elijah Muhammad, as being more important.
From mainstream Islamic perspectives, its teachings are heretical, with its theology being shirk (blasphemy). Mainstream Muslims view it as "a religious movement which has selectively adopted some Islamic beliefs and concepts," but which is not "truly Islamic."

The Nation is a highly centralized, hierarchical movement, and has been described as authoritarian. Unlike practitioners of Rastafari, a contemporary of the NOI which shares many of its key concerns, members of the Nation do not exhibit considerable variation in their approach to the religion, displaying a high degree of uniformity and conformity among followers. However, there is no specific holy text produced by the NOI, and its teachings have not remained static, but have changed throughout its history. Over the course of its history it has for instance adopted additional elements from mainstream Islam, and Farrakhan's second Nation also bears some distinct differences from its predecessor.

Beliefs

Theology 

The sociologist of religion David V. Barrett noted that the Nation's theology is "very distinct" and "extremely detailed." The Nation provides conflicting statements about its theology; although it professes commitment to the monotheistic idea of a single God, its discourse refers to multiple gods, meaning that it can be interpreted as polytheistic. These gods are described as being anthropomorphic, taking human form.

The NOI teaches that history can be divided into distinct cycles, each ruled by a new god who takes over from his predecessor. The Nation teaches that none of these gods are immortal, but all die, at which a new god will take their place. A central tenet of its theology is the portrayal of Allah as a black man, and Nation members believe that this was the form that the first god consciously took. Each god has different abilities and degrees of power. The Nation regards its founder, Fard Muhammad, as the latest of these gods, or "God in person". They believe that he is the first god to have the same powers as the inaugural god, namely the ability to return the universe to its primordial darkness and then recreate it, for he has developed the divine capacity innate to black people to the maximum degree. It teaches that although this founder disappeared in 1934, he had secretly moved to Mecca and would live for another 409 years. For the Nation, he takes on the traditional roles of God, the Mahdi, and the Messiah.

The Nation promotes the idea that "God is man and man is God, that God has a presence inside human individuals." It teaches that the black race, in its natural state, is divine; collectively, the black race is God, or a "nation of Gods". Elijah Muhammad said that "all Muslims are Allahs." According to its teachings, "knowledge of self" is key for black people to realize their inner divinity. The NOI thus teaches that by following its teachings, one can recognize one's inner Godliness.

Fishman and Soage highlighted that the Nation's "core theological principles are completely divorced from the traditional Islamic faith." The Nation's theology differs from the mainstream Islamic belief in a fundamental ontological divide between humanity and God; in mainstream Islam, Allah is always portrayed as eternal and non-anthropomorphic, which is at odds with the theology of the NOI. Also conflicting with mainstream Islam is the NOI's claim that there is no afterlife; Elijah Muhammad wrote that "when you are dead, you are DEAD." He taught that there is no spiritual realm, with the material universe being all that exists, although he also stated that humans could develop parapsychological powers and that he personally had telepathic abilities.

Cosmogony and the Tribe of Shabazz 

The Nation teaches that in the beginning there was nothing but darkness. Then, 76 trillion years ago, the first god willed himself into being, taking 6 million years to form into his desired appearance; that of a black man. In this account, this god chose his skin color in reference to the blackness from which he had emerged. According to the Nation, the first god then created the Sun and the planets. As his helpers, he created more black men and took his place on a council of 24 imams; 12 greater and 12 lesser. Each of these imams takes a turn being god for one cycle each. 15,000 years ago, these ancient scientists—who had knowledge of the future—wrote their knowledge down in a text, the Mother Book. Parts of this, the NOI claims, have been given to humanity as the Torah, Gospels, and Quran.

The Nation holds that the moon was created when one of the scientists tried to destroy the Earth with explosives, resulting in a chunk of the Earth's mass being forced into orbit. The Nation also alleges that Asia and Africa were once a single continent.
In endorsing a form of creationism, the Nation rejects evolution and believes that the existence of dinosaurs is a hoax perpetrated by members of the white race.
The NOI promotes numerology, the belief that numbers possess hidden meanings; it believes that the number 19 is key to decoding scriptures such as the Quran, and takes the view that it is meaningful that the names of both Elijah Muhammad and Louis Farrakhan have 14 letters in them.

The Nation teaches that the first humans were the "Original" or "Asiatic" race, whom it describes as members of the Tribe of Shabazz. It claims that this Tribe inhabited Egypt's Nile Valley as well as the area around Mecca in the Arabian peninsula; Elijah Muhammad claimed that Mecca was the Tribe's original home and "the ONLY HOLY SPOT on our planet". He claimed that the Tribe were Muslim and that their language was Arabic. In the Nation's discourse, these early humans are labelled "black", described as having dark skin as well as smooth, straight hair, closely resembling dark-complexioned Arabians or South Asians rather than Sub-Saharan Africans. Elijah Muhammad claimed that some of this Original Race were later given Afro-textured hair to assist their lives in the "jungles of East Asia", by which he meant Africa.

The NOI's conception of race differs from that of most Americans. For the Nation, everyone not of West European genetic origin is a descendant of the Original Asiatic Race. In the group's discourse, "black" does not simply mean those of Sub-Saharan African genetic descent, but all people of color, including Asians, North Africans, and Native Americans; only light-skinned people of West European descent are excluded. Elijah Muhammad for instance referred to "black, brown, yellow [and] red" people as collectively constituting "black mankind", which he then juxtaposed against the "white race". He considered some East Europeans, such as Albanians, to be descendants of the Original Asiatic Race. The Nation teaches that all descendants of the Original Race were Muslims by their intrinsic nature, but that many created heretical deviations such as Hinduism; some of those who broke Islamic rules were exiled from Asia-Africa to North America, where they became the continent's native population.

The myth of Yakub and the white race 

The NOI promotes a story called the myth of Yakub, which received its fullest exposition in Elijah Muhammad's 1965 book Message to the Blackman. Yakub is presented as a black scientist who was a child prodigy; by the age of 18 he had learned everything that Mecca's universities had to teach him. He attracted a following but caused trouble, leading the Meccan authorities to exile him and his 6000 followers to Pelan, the Mediterranean island of Patmos.

There, the NOI claims, Yakub engaged in a selective breeding program to create the white race. This entailed breeding new children, with those who were too dark being killed at birth and their bodies being fed to wild animals or incinerated. Over two centuries, Yakub's experiments created a group of blonde, light-skinned people, the white race. The myth of Yakub presents the white race as being degenerate, sub-human, and bereft of divinity. Because of this, the NOI teaches that white people are intrinsically prone to lying, violence, and brutality. Elijah Muhammad repeatedly referred to the white man as the devil. The NOI’s ideas regarding white people have been labelled both racist and racialist.

According to the Nation's teachings, Yakub's newly created white race sowed discord among the black race, and thus were exiled to live in the caves of Europe. In this narrative, it was in Europe that the white race engaged in bestiality and degenerated, resulting in the emergence of apes and monkeys. Aware of their role in the future, Allah sent Moses to teach the white race to cook and wear clothes. According to the Nation, Jesus of Nazareth was also sent to try and civilise the white race; Farrakhan's NOI has taught that Jesus was not the Messiah, as Christians believe, but that he instead pointed to the later coming of the true messiah, Elijah Muhammad. They reject the Christian belief that Jesus was God, that he was the product of a virgin birth, or that he was crucified and resurrected.

In the Nation's teachings, Allah permitted the white race to rule the Earth for 6000 years, a period that is almost at an end. The NOI teaches that the white race spread out from Europe and began to dominate the world. It conquered and enslaved the Tribe of Shabazz, shipping many of them to the Americas as part of the Atlantic slave trade. It claims that most of these enslaved blacks forgot their true names, their Arabic language, and their Muslim identity, instead embracing Christianity, the religion of the white oppressor. In this enslaved state, the black people lost their morality, engaging in sinful behaviour such as fornication and drinking alcohol. The Nation teaches that Allah allowed all this to happen so that the black race would realise humanity's inner potential for evil and discover how to defeat it, thus enabling them to realize their divine capacity and become Gods.

The subjugation of African Americans is thus seen as part of an ancient white conspiracy. According to the NOI, most whites are unaware of their true origins, but that senior Freemasons have this knowledge. It interprets opposition to the Nation from the U.S. government and white society as evidence of this. The United States is equated with the city of Babylon as presented in the Bible. According to the Nation, 1914 marked the end of the 6000 years of white rule.

The Nation interprets many of the problems facing the African American community in this light, for instance, Farrakhan has claimed that the white establishment has encouraged a black gang culture to provide an excuse for the police killing of black youths, and that they are also responsible for flooding black-majority urban areas with drugs. Both Farrakhan and senior NOI spokesperson Abdul Alim Muhammad have claimed that the white establishment created the AIDS virus to exterminate black people. The Nation is openly critical of U.S. aggression towards countries with non-white majorities, especially when those countries also have Muslim majorities. In keeping with its anti-Western ethos, it has also adopted a consistently anti-Israel position, being both anti-Zionist and anti-imperialist.

Christianity is seen as "white man's religion." It is regarded as having perpetuated white domination and furthered the oppression of the African diaspora in the Americas; it is also associated with slavery and colonialism in the Nation of Islam's discourse. The religion is treated with suspicion out of the belief that the oppressed (African Americans) and the oppressors (European Americans) cannot share the same God.

During the time when Malcolm X was a member and leader of the Nation of Islam, he preached that black people were genetically superior to white people but were dominated by a system of white supremacy:

Eschatology and the Mother Plane 

The NOI is millenarian, believing that humanity is living in end times. It propounds a distinct eschatology drawing on the Book of Revelation. Central to its view of the apocalypse is a large spaceship, known as the Wheel, the Mother Plane, or the Mother Ship. Members usually refer to it with female pronouns. Elijah Muhammad described this as "a small human planet," claiming that it is half a mile by half a mile in diameter. The Nation teaches that this vessel is the Merkabah that appears in the Book of Ezekiel (1: 4–28). It teaches that Allah and many of his scientists live in a magnificent city on the Mother Plane, from which they monitor humanity; Farrakhan has claimed that Elijah Muhammad never died but is resident aboard this ship. The Nation teaches that there are also smaller vessels, "baby planes," docked inside the Mother Ship and that these travel to visit Earth.

The Nation teaches that a period of deteriorating inter-racial tensions will culminate in the apocalypse. NOI members have repeatedly claimed that this apocalypse is imminent; Farrakhan for instance predicted that the Gulf War of 1990 would spark it, while Tynetta Muhammad predicted it would occur in 2001. According to Nation teaching, the Mother Plane will appear above the Earth and transport the righteous to live upon it. It will then use the baby planes to place bombs beneath the Earth's surface, which will explode and wipe out the old, white-dominated order. The Earth's atmosphere will then burn for 390 years and spend another 610 cooling down.

Once the Earth has returned to a habitable state, Allah will return the righteous to live there, in a new black paradise. In his book The Supreme Wisdom, Elijah Muhammad claimed that after the apocalypse, "Peace, joy and happiness will have no end." Those living in this perfect society will eat the finest food and wear clothes of silk interwoven with gold. The NOI has taught that the white ruling elite are aware of this forthcoming apocalypse and that the U.S. exploration of space and the Strategic Defense Initiative are futile attempts to protect themselves against the Mother Plane.

Black nationalism and separatism 

Ideologically, the NOI is black nationalist, and has sometimes been perceived as a Black Power political organization. Scholar of religion Mattias Gardell commented that the idea of black unity is "at the very core of the NOI ideology." It seeks to empower black people by giving them a positive self-identity, purging ideas of white superiority, and black inferiority, from its followers. In the Nation's view, black liberation requires a religious dimension.
It regards African Americans, or black people more broadly, as the Chosen People, espousing a cosmology in which the black race is superior and the white race inferior.

The Nation is black separatist, rejecting the integration of the black and white races. It called for the creation of a separate and sovereign African American nation-state in the southern part of what is currently the United States, portraying this as compensation for the unpaid labor of their enslaved ancestors. Farrakhan has also suggested that the countries of Africa should set aside land on that continent for the African diaspora, characterising this as a reparation for the complicity of West African states in the Atlantic slave trade.

It cites the formation of Israel as a state for the Jewish people in 1948 as a precedent for the establishment of such a state. Gardell suggested that any such black state formed under the Nation's leadership would be theocratic, authoritarian, and totalitarian. In his view, the Nation's political stance incorporated elements associated with both the right and left, and in doing so was similar to the stance of the far-right Third Position.

The Nation's racial separatism was at odds with the mainstream civil rights movement of the 1950s and 1960s. The Nation was critical of African American activists who promoted racial integration, such as Martin Luther King Jr. and the National Association for the Advancement of Colored People, regarding them as "Uncle Tom Negroes." In contrast to King's calls for non-violent protest against segregation and racial violence, the Nation maintained it was a moral obligation for African Americans to defend their community from attack. As a NOI spokesman, Malcolm X claimed that while they would not instigate violence, the Nation would use it to defend themselves.

Unlike the Garveyites and Rastafari who strongly emphasise links between the African diaspora and Africa itself, Elijah Muhammad and the NOI have instead focused their attention on the African diaspora in the Americas, rejecting a specifically Pan-African ideology. Elijah Muhammad stated that "where as the Black man in Africa is our brother, our central responsibility is with the Black man here in the wilderness of North America." Rather than treating Africa as a homeland, the Nation's origin myths present Mecca in Saudi Arabia as the original home of African Americans; Africa itself was often portrayed in Nation writings as the least desirable of the Original Asiatic lands.

Gender and sexuality issues 

The NOI's teachings on gender issues are conservative and patriarchal, promoting strict gender roles for men and women. Emphasis is placed on the family unit; the Nation maintains that the security of the black family unit is ensured when its members adhere to their gendered duties and responsibilities.

Seeking to restore black manhood, the Nation expresses great concern regarding the emasculation of black men, attributing this attitude to the failure of black men to prevent the sexual assault of black women by white men over the centuries. It expects men to be providers for their family. Women are expected to act as caretakers of the household and the children, and are cautioned from forming friendships with men. Outsiders often perceive the Nation's women as being victims of male oppression and control.

The group's leadership is overwhelmingly male, although several women rose to senior positions during the 1990s; in 1998 the Nation appointed its first woman minister, Ava Muhammad, as head of Mosque Number 15 in Georgia. In various cases, Nation women still play an active role in their communities, sometimes challenging established gender norms in the organization.

The NOI strictly enforces heterosexual monogamy among its members and encourages sexual abstinence prior to marriage. Members seeking to court another are expected to inform the captain of their local FOI or MGT about their intentions.
Men found to have beaten their wives are temporarily suspended from Nation membership. Divorce is frowned upon, but not forbidden. Children are expected to study hard, avoid street culture, and respect their elders. Farrakhan was initially highly critical of rap music because he argued it promoted sexual promiscuity.

Although Nation members are allowed to marry non-members, the group stipulates that they should only marry other black people, claiming that sex with white women emasculates black men. Birth control methods are criticised as an attempt by the white establishment to lower the black birthrate, although Farrakhan stated support for abortion in cases of rape or incest or where the woman's life is endangered by the pregnancy.
Same-sex relationships are condemned as immoral; Farrakhan for instance banned gay men from his Million Man March, bringing accusations of homophobia against him and the Nation.

Practices

Services, prayer, and celebration 

During the 1960s, the NOI's places of worship were called both temples and mosques. As well as serving a religious function, these can also be used as a community center, bank, school, and child-care facility.

Those attending meetings will sometimes be searched by members of the Fruit of Islam (FOI) or the Muslim Girl's Training group, who look both for weapons and for objects like cosmetics and cigarettes which are disapproved of. After this, the attendees are seen to their seats, usually rows of benches. The sexes are segregated during worship, women on the right and men on the left. The tone of Nation services is sombre and quiet. Services typically begin with the statement "As-salamu alaykum" (peace be upon you), with the congregation responding "Wa 'alaikum As-salam" (and also upon you). Meetings at the mosque are both opened and closed with prayers, and the Nation's "national anthem" may be played. A lecture will be provided by one of the ministers. The minister may read out verses selected from either the Bible or Qur'an.

In the late 1950s, Elijah Muhammad published a prayer manual outlining how his followers should pray five times a day; this involved an ablution beforehand. He stipulated that these prayers should be in English, although commented that in future he would explain how to do so in Arabic. In later articles, he explained that his followers should face towards Mecca as they pray, symbolising their journey toward the restoration of black greatness.

The most important date in the Nation's year is February 26, Saviours' Day, which is believed to be the birthday of Fard Muhammad. This is the date on which the organization holds its annual national convention. Under Farrakhan, the Nation has also held a second Saviour's Day each year, on October 7, to mark the birth of Elijah Muhammad.

Members are encouraged to make the hajj pilgrimage to Mecca; Elijah Muhammad himself did so three times.

Lifestyle 

The Nation requests that new members change any names inherited from slave-owners who owned their ancestors as a declaration of mental emancipation. This is not considered necessary if the new member has a name that is already African in origin. During the mid-20th century it began encouraging the use of "X" as a surname, symbolising what they regarded as African American identity as an "ex-slave" and also as a marker for their lost ancestral name. As this results in many individuals having the same name, numbers are added before the X to differentiate members (i.e. "Charles 2X," "Charles 3X").

The NOI encourages its followers to live highly disciplined lifestyles, revolving around structure and order; these conservative and ascetic approaches have led to followers being called "Black Puritans." They are encouraged to obey the law, to seek gainful employment, to always be punctual, to avoid buying on credit, and to not gamble. It is typical for male members to cut their hair very short, sometimes shaving the head entirely, and to not wear a beard.

This signifies their willingness to abide to the strict rules of the organisation and their renunciation of much personal choice. They are expected to wear suits with either ties or bowties; those who are part of the Fruit of Islam guards wear military-style uniforms. Women are commanded to dress modestly; they are not permitted to wear trousers and are encouraged to cover their heads, although the latter is deemed optional.

The NOI teaches that practitioners should seek to keep fit and maintain a healthy diet. Vegetarianism is encouraged among members, although not obligatory, with Elijah Muhammad writing that "meat was never intended for man to eat." In How to Eat How to Live, Elijah Muhammad urged his followers to subsist primarily on fruit, vegetables, and certain grains, and to choose lamb if they must eat meat. Discouraged foods include dried fruits, white flour, additives, and fast food. Although its own produce is not wholly organic, the Nation is supportive of organic food and the avoidance of genetically modified crops, insecticides, and pesticides.

The NOI also encourages followers to avoid foods associated with the slave culture of the U.S., such as cornbread, catfish, and collard greens, deeming this cuisine to be undignified. Concerned about obesity and diabetes among African Americans, Elijah Muhammad urged his followers to restrict their caloric intake, ideally by eating only one meal a day. He claimed that this would extend the human lifespan and that those who ate only once every 24 hours would live for 150 years and that those who ate once every seven days would live for 1,050 years. Members are also encouraged to conduct regular three-day fasts, and to fast during the daylight for the entirety of December. The NOI also prohibits the use of alcohol, tobacco, and other recreational drugs, and has recommended the avoidance of vaccines for children.

Economic and educational independence 

Espousing economic nationalism, the Nation follows the ideas of earlier thinkers like Booker T. Washington and Marcus Garvey in emphasizing the construction of black infrastructure as a means of community empowerment. The Nation has created many companies, including the Salaam restaurant chain, the Shabazz bakeries, the Fashahnn Islamic clothing range, the Clean 'N Fresh skin and haircare products, Abundant Life Clinics, and in Chicago it owns a mall.

It owns various clothing stores and food markets. Since the 1980s, it has also sought government contracts, and in 1988, it established the Security Agency Incorporated, which provided FOI patrols for clients. In 1985 it launched its POWER (People Organized and Working for Economic Rebirth) project, designed to redirect black purchasing power toward black-owned businesses. It also seeks the collective economic advancement of African Americans through individual achievement; various women members created their own businesses, sometimes run from the home.

Some of its African American left-wing, anti-capitalist critics have derisively dismissed the Nation's approach to economics as black capitalism; Farrakhan has responded that while socialism appeals to him, capitalism is the only feasible road to economic empowerment for African Americans.

The Nation prioritises land ownership to increase food production and autonomy for African Americans; a commonly used slogan among the NOI is that "The farm is the engine of our national life." By the early 1970s, it had 20,000 acres of farm land in Michigan, Alabama, and Georgia, while in 1994 Farrakhan's Nation purchased 1,556 acres of rural South Georgia near Bronwood, naming it Muhammad Farms. Much of the produce grown here is distributed to NOI mosques around the country. NOI members also own urban gardens in various U.S. cities.

In 1991, the Nation launched its Three Year Economic Savings Plan, asking followers to send them $10 a month over the three years, money that would collectively allow the group to buy more farmland. For the Nation, acquiring land and growing food is regarded as a means of building self-determination for African Americans. It hopes to establish a system of black-owned farms through which to feed 40 million black people, with the stated aim of providing at least one healthy meal a day for every African American.

The NOI is highly critical of the U.S. school system, believing that, by being Eurocentric in its focus and concealing the achievement of non-white societies, it perpetuates white supremacy. To this end, the Nation has established its own educational system. Across the U.S. it has established Muhammad Universities of Islam; most of these are elementary schools, although a few also offer secondary education. These emphasize science, mathematics, black history, Arabic, and NOI doctrine;

Farrakhan has said that they need to provide black children with "an education to make them Gods." In these schools, boys and girls are taught separately; pupils are only given two weeks of vacation each year. Combating the idea that academic achievement entails "acting white," the Nation has sought to associate hard work in school with pride in being black. As well as African American pupils, some of these schools have also accepted students from Latino, Asian, and Pacific Island communities.

Civic engagement 

The Nation also has a longstanding record of involvement in civic, economic, and political activities outside the strictly religious arena. In some economically deprived areas, they have played a role in providing services that the public institutions have not. In some areas with high African American populations, it has for instance engaged in door-to-door campaigns to raise awareness about local pollution, or used the FOI to patrol neighborhoods as a community watchdog, especially to stop drug-dealing. The Nation has also urged African Americans not to rely on state welfare payments, arguing that this undermines the community's ability to be self-sufficient.

Edward E. Curtis IV stated that the Nation is "both highly religious and political at the same time", while Gardell noted that it "formulated emphatic political demands". However, the NOI has urged its members to avoid mainstream electoral politics; in 1961, it was observed that its members rarely voted. Elijah Muhammad refused to support any African Americans campaigning for election, although Louis Farrakhan backed Jesse Jackson's 1984 campaign to become the Democratic Party's presidential candidate, and in 1990 three NOI candidates stood for election in the U.S.

Many people have presumed the NOI to be a revolutionary movement, however, it has not sought to foment political revolution or violent social change, instead focusing its emphasis on shifting the consciousness of its members, encouraging them to focus on personal moral improvement, family building, and economic activity. Its members avoided involvement in the race riots of the 1960s.

History

Background 

Islam had a presence in North America prior to the formation of the United States. African Muslims were among the Spanish expeditions that explored the continent during the early modern period, and were also among the many enslaved people transported there via the Atlantic slave trade of the 16th to 19th centuries. It is estimated that, at the time of the American Revolution in the 1760s–80s, approximately 15 percent of enslaved Africans and African Americans in the new United States were Muslim. Although Islam probably died out among the African American community over subsequent generations, the notion that Islam was a religion historically associated with African Americans influenced the emergence of groups like the NOI in the early 20th century.

The early NOI's theology was informed by various sources, including older forms of black nationalism, Garveyism, the Moorish Science Temple of America, the Jehovah's Witnesses, and Black Freemasonry. The Nation was significantly influenced by Marcus Garvey, a Jamaican-born black nationalist who lived in the U.S. from 1916 to 1927, and who formed the Universal Negro Improvement Association and African Communities League (UNIA); Zoe Coley commented that "UNIA provided the cultural bedrock for the NOI". Garvey's economic nationalism, whereby he called for African American economic self-sufficiency and enterprise, was a particular influence.

The Moorish Science Temple, an organization also promoting an idiosyncratic religion that described its teachings as Islam, would also be a key influence on the Nation. This had been established by the North Carolina-born African American Noble Drew Ali in Newark, New Jersey, in 1913. Drew Ali claimed that he was the reincarnation of both Jesus and Muhammad, and maintained that African Americans should refer to themselves as "Moorish Americans," reflecting what he believed were their connections to the Islamic Moors of North Africa. The Nation then emerged in the context of the 1930s, when large numbers of African Americans were migrating from southern states to the cities of the north; most of its early members were southern migrants who had settled in Detroit.

Wallace Fard Muhammad 

The Nation of Islam was founded by Wallace Fard Muhammad, who appeared in Detroit in July 1930, when he began preaching his ideas among the city's African Americans. Fard Muhammad claimed that he was an Arab from Mecca who had come to the United States on a mission to the African American people, whom he called the "Nation of Islam," to restore them to their original faith. The Nation has since taught that he was born in Mecca on February 26, 1877, the son of a black father and white mother; in their view, he was Allah himself.

Outside of the Nation, various theories have been proposed as to the true identity of Fard Muhammad. The Federal Bureau of Investigation (FBI) later noted that Fard Muhammad's fingerprints matched those of Wallie D. Ford, a white man who had a record of arrests and had served a three-year sentence in San Quentin Prison for drugs charges. Ford had been released in May 1929, a year before the appearance of Fard Muhammad. The NOI reject the identification of Fard Muhammad as Ford, claiming that the FBI forged the fingerprint evidence. Another allegation is that Fard had been a member of the Moorish Science Temple of America, David Ford-el, and had tried to claim its leadership by proclaiming himself to be the reincarnation of founder Noble Drew Ali but failed.

Fard Muhammad's following grew rapidly. Around 7000 to 8000 people attended his meetings, which were held three days a week. Some of those attracted to it had previously been members of the Moorish Science Temple. He wrote two manuals, the Secret Ritual of the Nation of Islam and the Teaching for the Lost Found Nation of Islam in a Mathematical Way. He also urged his followers to listen to the radio sermons of the Watch Tower Society and Baptist fundamentalists. He established a bureaucratic administration within the Nation, its own system of schools, and the Fruit of Islam (FOI) paramilitary wing for men and the Muslim Girls Training School for women.

In 1931, an African American man named Elijah Poole became a disciple of Fard Muhammad. He had been born to a poor family in Bold Springs, Georgia in 1897; his father was a sharecropper and Baptist preacher. In 1923, Poole and his wife Clara relocated to Detroit, where they settled in the black ghetto of Paradise Valley. There, he joined Garvey's UNIA, and worked in industrial plants before becoming unemployed amid the Great Depression. On joining the Nation of Islam, Fard Muhammad gave Poole the new name of Elijah Karriem.

In 1932 the Detroit Police Department arrested an NOI member for a murder which they claimed was a human sacrifice. This led to headline news which often identified the NOI as a "Voodoo cult". The police then raided the Nation's headquarters and arrested Fard Muhammad. He was soon released; the killer was declared insane. After this incident, Fard Muhammad gave Elijah Poole increasing powers, declaring him Supreme Minister of the Nation and renaming him Elijah Muhammad. In 1933, Elijah Muhammad then set up a new temple on Chicago's South Side. Fard Muhammad was arrested several further times; in September 1933 he was arrested for disorderly conduct in Chicago, which is his last known verified whereabouts. In 1934, Fard Muhammad disappeared without notifying his followers or designating a successor. Rumours spread that he had moved to Europe or that he had been killed, either by the police or by ex-followers of his.

Elijah Muhammad's leadership 

With Fard Muhammad gone, Elijah Muhammad took over as head of the Nation. It was under his leadership "that the NOI's theology crystallized". Elijah Muhammad claimed that Fard Muhammad had been the latest Allah and that he had now returned to his own realm, with Elijah Muhammad remaining on Earth as his messenger. His wife Clara took on the identity of Khadija. Under Elijah Muhammad's leadership, the NOI relocated its headquarters to Chicago. He then spent the following seven years traveling around the United States, mostly along the East Coast, promoting his religion to African Americans. Under his leadership, the Nation grew in size and influence.

During the Second World War, the FBI started monitoring the Nation; FBI informants reported pro-Japanese sentiment being expressed at its meetings. Many Nation members refused the military draft, and in September 1942, the FBI arrested 65 NOI members, including Elijah Muhammad, who was incarcerated for refusing to register for the draft. He was released in August 1946, at which point he found the Nation's membership had declined. He lived at a villa named The Palace in Chicago's Hyde Park area, and in winter moved to a large ranch outside Phoenix, Arizona. Increasingly exposed to Sunni Islam, Elijah Muhammad drew more elements from it into the Nation, and also undertook the hajj pilgrimage to Mecca three times, in 1959, 1967, and 1971.

During the latter part of the 1950s, the group's membership grew. In 1959, the FBI encouraged the media to attack the Nation, hoping to discredit it. It was in this year that a documentary about the group, The Hate that Hate Produced, was screened. This press criticism backfired, giving the group significant attention and assisting its recruitment. The NOI became a foil for the civil rights movement, which presented the group as evidence for the harmful effect that poor race relations were having in the U.S. In 1962, Los Angeles police raided one of the Nation's temples; one member was killed and seven injured, attracting national press attention. In 1963, a schism in the Nation's Temple Number 7 in Harlem led to the creation of a new group, the Five Percent Nation of Islam.

One of the Nation's most significant members at this time was Malcolm X. Born Malcolm Little, he discovered the Nation while in prison; following his release in 1952 he rose swiftly through its hierarchy. In 1960, he launched the newspaper Muhammad Speaks, which reached a circulation of over 600,000. In 1963, he became the Nation's first National Representative. He also travelled internationally; in Britain, he met with Michael de Freitas, who converted to the Nation and created a British branch. Another prominent NOI member was the boxer Muhammad Ali. Born Cassius Clay, he encountered the Nation in 1961 and received significant media criticism after announcing his membership of the group in 1964.

Malcolm X went on the hajj pilgrimage to Mecca, where he came across white Muslims, an experience that shifted him from his total hostility to white people. Immediately prior to this, he also began ideologically distancing himself from NOI by declaring Black Nationalism his political philosophy. This was directly in violation of Elijah Muhammad's vision, in which the Nation was apolitical. In light of these experiences, in March 1964 he left the Nation and became a Sunni Muslim. He began denouncing Elijah Muhammad for his extramarital affairs and accused the Nation of holding back the revolutionary potential of African Americans. In February 1965, Malcolm X was assassinated in New York. The following year, three members of the NOI were convicted of the killing. There was press speculation that the Nation's leaders were complicit, something which damaged the group's reputation; recruitment declined in the latter half of the 1960s. As the Black Power movement emerged in the late 1960s, many observers saw the Nation as its forerunner and a vanguard, with the Nation claiming that it had inspired the movement.

In 1972, the NOI bought the St. Constantine Greek Orthodox Church in Chicago and transformed it into their headquarters temple, Mosque Maryam, and by 1974 it had either temples or study groups in every U.S. state and the District of Columbia. Relations with law enforcement remained strained; in 1972, a New York City policeman was shot and killed during a search of a NOI Mosque in Harlem. It had continued to face opposition from the FBI, who engaged in a renewed counterintelligence project to destabilise it from the late 1960s. This included sowing discord between the Nation and the Black Panther Party, encouraging several incidents in which Black Panthers attacked NOI newspaper sellers.
The NOI also engaged in recurring conflicts with other Islamic groups that had predominantly black memberships. It argued with Hamaas Abdul Khaalis' Hanafi Muslim group, and in 1973 a group of Nation of Islam members killed seven Hanafi Muslims, five of them children. The Nation's leadership denied sanctioning this attack.

Wallace Muhammad and the NOI's transition to Sunni Islam 

In 1975, Elijah Muhammad died and was succeeded by his son, Wallace Muhammad. Wallace Muhammad had had a strained relationship with his father and his father's teachings; while imprisoned in the early 1960s he had moved closer to Sunni Islam and had left the Nation on several occasions during the 1960s and 1970s, having re-joined in 1974. As leader, Wallace Muhammad launched what he called a "Second Resurrection" in the movement.

He increasingly aligned the group with Sunni Islam, rejecting many of the Nation's idiosyncratic teachings, including its claim that Fard was God, that Elijah Muhammad had been a prophet, the Myth of Yakub, and the claims about the Mother Plane. He retained the Nation's themes of black pride, healthy diets, sexual modesty, and economic self-determination. "Temples" were renamed "mosques," while "ministers" were renamed "imams." The FOI was disbanded, with Wallace calling it a "hooligan outfit." Black nationalism was abandoned, and the ban on white people joining the Nation was lifted.

In November 1976, the Nation was renamed the World Community of al-Islam in the West, and in April 1978, it was renamed the American Muslim Mission. Wallace Muhammad also renamed himself, first to Warith Deen and then to Warithuddin Muhammad. Wallace Muhammad claimed that these changes were in accordance with his father's intentions; he claimed to be in contact with Fard Muhammad, and that the founder had established the NOI's idiosyncratic beliefs as a means of gradually introducing Islamic teachings to African Americans, with the ultimate intention of bringing them to mainstream Sunni Islam.

He claimed that the Nation's old belief that the white man was the Devil referred to mental whiteness, a state that is rebelling against Allah, rather than light-skinned people themselves. Most mosques remained with Wallace Muhammad during these reforms but some mosques rejected them, seeking to return to the group's original teachings; small splinter groups emerged in Detroit, Atlanta, and Baltimore. In 1985, Wallace Muhammad disbanded the organization, telling his followers to affiliate instead with their local mosques.

Louis Farrakhan's revival 

The leading figure in rejecting Wallace Muhammad's reforms was Louis Farrakhan, who, with other disaffected members began to rebuild the Nation of Islam in 1977. Born in the Bronx to Caribbean migrants, Farrakhan had been a nightclub singer prior to joining the original Nation in 1955. In 1964 he had become minister of the NOI's Harlem Temple and in 1967 a national representative of Elijah Muhammad. Under Wallace Muhammad's leadership, Farrakhan was relocated to Chicago, widely seen as a demotion.

Farrakhan presented himself as Elijah Muhammad's true successor; his followers described Wallace Muhammad's leadership as "the Fall." Farrakhan's NOI spent the first several years focusing on rebuilding; the Fruit of Islam was re-established. In 1979, Farrakhan established a newspaper, The Final Call, which by 1994 had a circulation of 500,000. In 1981, Farrakhan's Nation held its first convention, and its membership began to increase rapidly in the mid-1980s. It was able to buy much of the property owned by its predecessor, including the Chicago Palace and the Stoney Island Mosque.

Farrakhan claimed that in 1985, at Tepotzotlán in Mexico, he was teleported aboard the Mother Plane and there was given advice on the future of the Nation. Masonic elements and numerology came to play an important part in Farrakhan's speeches. Farrakhan's Nation expanded its international network, including building links in Africa; particularly strong links were built between Farrakhan and Ghanaian President Jerry Rawlings. Under Farrakhan, the NOI adopted more elements of mainstream Islamic practice, although not to the extent of Wallace Muhammad.

Although Farrakhan was critical of the heavy use of themes such as sex, violence, and drugs in rap and hip hop music, during the 1980s and 1990s artists influenced by the Nation who were active in these genres played a role in spreading the Nation's message. Farrakhan had grown concerned by the growth of gang violence, especially among African American youths, and in 1989 launched his "Stop the Killing" campaign to combat it. He played a key role in getting two of the country's largest gangs, the Bloods and the Crips, to sign a ceasefire in May 1992. Later in the 1990s, Farrakhan's NOI opened its first mosques in Britain.

Farrakhan organized the Million Man March through Washington DC in 1995 which united a range of African American groups to counter negative portrayals of black manhood; it was the largest black demonstration in U.S. history.
In 2010, Farrakhan announced his embrace of Dianetics and has actively encouraged NOI members to undergo auditing from the Church of Scientology. Farrakhan praised L. Ron Hubbard, founder of Dianetics and Scientology, stating that his ideas were "exceedingly valuable to every Caucasian person on this Earth". NOI Sister Charlene Muhammad received the "Dianetics Auditor of the Year" Award 2018.

Organization

Leadership and financing 

Family ties are an important element of the NOI's senior ranks; various members of Elijah Muhammad's family were for instance married to members of Farrakhan's family.

As of 2020, the Nation consisted of ten ministries: for Spiritual Development, Agriculture, Education, Information, Health, Trade and Commerce, Defense, Justice, Arts and Culture, and Science and Technology. It also established a shadow ministry, forming the prototype for the governance of the future state it hopes to lead.

The Fruit of Islam is an elite group of men within the NOI, tasked with adhering to its rules more strictly than other members. The FOI members are trained in military protocol, wrestling, boxing, and judo. They are charged with protecting the temples. The Nation has also established Muslim Girls' Training for women, teaching them domestic skills, self defense tactics, and other life skills.

The NOI explains that its finances come primarily from donations and its businesses. At the start of the 1960s, it was reported that members were expected to donate a set part of their earnings to the group each year; as of 1952, this reportedly constituted a third of a member's annual income. In 1976, Wallace Muhammad estimated the Nation's net worth to be $46 million, although revealed it had a severe cash flow problem, owed millions in back taxes to the Internal Revenue Service, and was making a loss with its agricultural operations. Although the Nation does not reveal the extent of its financial resources, in the 1990s its assets were estimated to total $80,000,000.

Press and media 

From its early days, the Nation used print media to promote its ideas, including the magazines Muhammad Speaks (1961–75) and The Final Call. Muhammad Speaks included contributions not only from Nation members, but also from leftist and progressive writers in the African American community. Members were encouraged to sell these magazines on street corners or sometimes door-to-door in African American-majority areas. These sellers were given sales quotas to fulfil and were sometimes punished if they failed to meet them. The Nation's first magazine aimed at women, Righteous Living, appeared in the early 1990s. As well as running shows on radio stations, and distributing videos, the Nation has also established websites and a presence across many social media outlets.

Domestic and international affiliations 

In the 1930s and 1940s, the Nation had links with Satokata Takahashi, a Japanese man who was promoting pro-Japanese sentiment among African American groups. Takahashi lived with an officer of the Nation for a time and also married a former member. Elijah Muhammad declared that Takahashi was teaching African Americans that "the Japanese were brothers and friends of the American Negroes". During the Second World War, in which the U.S. fought against Japan, many Nation members expressed pro-Japanese sentiment and refused the draft to fight against the Japanese military, stating that they would not fight people whom they regarded as fellow members of the Original Asiatic Race.

Under Elijah Muhammad, the Nation established relations with various Muslim countries, regarded as strategic allies in its conflict with the U.S. government. In 1957, Malcolm X organized a conference on colonialism attended by delegates from Egypt, Iraq, Sudan, and Morocco, while Elijah Muhammad met with Egyptian President Gamal Abdel Nasser in 1959 and the Libyan leader Muammar Gaddafi in 1972. On taking control, Farrakhan also pursued links with various Muslim-majority countries, visiting Ghana and Libya in 1985. For many years, Gaddafi was the Nation's most prominent international supporter and offered them assistance in various forms. His government gave the Nation a $3 million interest-free loan in 1972 to purchase its Chicago South Side centre, and another $5 million interest-free loan in 1985 to fund its black enterprise program. It later offered Farrakhan's Nation $1 billion, which the U.S. government sought to block. In 1996, Farrakhan embarked on a tour of Africa and the Middle East, meeting with leaders including Gaddafi, Ghana's Jerry Rawlings, Nigeria's Sani Abacha, South Africa's Nelson Mandela, and Iraq's Saddam Hussein. On that tour, he also attended annual celebrations of the Iranian Revolution in Tehran; he visited Iran again in 2018.

Like Garvey's UNIA before them, the Nation has also built links with white nationalist and other far-right white groups on the basis of their shared belief in racial separatism. Malcolm X revealed that the Nation had held meetings with representatives of the Ku Klux Klan (KKK) and the American Nazi Party (ANP). The ANP's leader George Lincoln Rockwell attended an NOI rally in Washington DC in 1961 and then spoke at the Nation's St Saviour's Day rally in Chicago in 1962. Links with the white far-right continued under Farrakhan's Nation, with Tom Metzger of the White Aryan Resistance donating money to the Nation in 1985 and expressing approval of its separatist aims. During the 1980s, the Nation also had a supportive relationship with the British National Front as the latter's Strasserite leadership were endorsing a united front against multi-racial society. During the 1990s, the Nation collaborated with members of the far-right LaRouche movement as part of their shared opposition to the U.S.-led Gulf War. These links have not prevented some white far-right opposition to the NOI; in 1993 the Fourth Reich Skinheads were revealed to have plotted to kill Farrakhan.

Conversion and demographics 

Since its early years, the NOI has sought to recruit disenfranchised African American Christians, and unemployed, disenchanted black youth. Its process of seeking converts is termed "fishing for the dead." To this end, the Nation holds regular open meetings, mass rallies, street-corner lectures, and prison outreach. Young "brothers" seek new recruits in "jails and penitentiaries, pool halls and barbershops, college campuses and street corners." It has also utilized books by Elijah Muhammad, radio broadcasts, and audio-recorded speeches to promote its message.

In its early decades, the Nation's appeal was strongest in poor African American neighborhoods. Colley thought that in these areas, it offered men living in poverty the "opportunity to reclaim their manhood and sense of pride", thus partly explaining its appeal. Although originating as a largely lower-class movement, over the course of the 20th century it became increasingly middle-class. Gardell suggested that this was partly due to the Nation's focus on hard work and rigid morality, which helped improve the economic situation of its members, coupled with the broader growth of the African American middle-class in this period. He also believed that the changing class composition, and with it a less hostile attitude to white-dominant American society, assisted the shift to Sunnism under Wallace Muhammad in the 1970s.

The group's recruitment efforts have proved particularly effective among drug addicts and incarcerated criminals, operating in areas where the African American Christian churches lack a strong presence. The Nation was active in prison ministry by the 1950s, with its numbers of imprisoned followers rising steadily in the latter part of that decade; many of its members, including Malcolm X, were recruited while in prison. Farrakhan stepped up the Nation's prison ministry in the 1980s in response to the increasing incarceration of young black men under the Reagan administration. By the early 1960s, prison authorities were raising concerns that the NOI was exacerbating racial tensions in prisons; the availability of NOI material in prisons has raised concerns in the U.S. government, with Peter King and Frank Wolf expressing concern about its potential role in the radicalization of inmates. Some incarcerated members have claimed to have experienced discriminatory treatment from prison authorities because of their religion.

Prior to 1975, only a small number of Hispanic American and Native American individuals were members of the NOI, although under Farrakhan the Nation began putting greater efforts into recruiting among these groups. The number of Latinos in the Nation is not known, although their presence in the group is much higher under Farrakhan than it was under Elijah Muhammad.
Not all members are likely to believe every teaching of the Nation implicitly, and there are reports of members who privately break the Nation's rules, for instance by listening to jazz records and smoking marijuana.

The Nation does not publicly reveal its membership numbers, and in the past it had a high turnover among its members, some eventually evolving into becoming conventional Sunni Muslims. Under Fard Muhammad's leadership, it reached a total of approximately 8000 members. By 1960, its membership was being estimated at between 30,000 and 100,000; in his 1961 study of the group, the scholar C. Eric Lincoln suggested the higher estimate. In 2007, the scholar of religion Lawrence A. Mamiya suggested that there were then around 50,000 members of the Nation. While based in the U.S., the Nation has also established either a presence or influence in all parts of the world where there is a dense clustering of the African diaspora. In 2006, Nuri Tinaz suggested that the Nation "may have" up to 2,000 members and sympathisers in the United Kingdom.

Accusations of prejudice 

Having been criticised by both blacks and non-blacks, the Nation has repeatedly been accused of stirring up racial hatred against white people. It has been called a hate group by African American civil rights activists including the NAACP's Roy Wilkins, as well as by the Southern Poverty Law Center, which claims that the NOI teaches a "theology of innate black superiority over whites". The Associated Press described the Nation as having, in the past, favored black supremacist views. In a 1993 speech at Kean College, the NOI representative Khalid Abdul Muhammad stated that White South Africans should be given 24 hours to leave their country, and all of those whites who are still in South Africa after that point should be killed; Farrakhan censured him for the tone of this speech. The Nation has also been accused of anti-LGBT rhetoric.

The NOI has repeatedly been accused of antisemitism, an accusation that it has denied. Accusations of antisemitism have also been levelled at Malcolm X and Farrakhan. In the 1980s, Farrakhan referred to Judaism as a "dirty religion" and described Adolf Hitler as a "very great man" who "raised Germany up from nothing". He dismissed the claim that the Jews are God's Chosen People as "ridiculous", insisting that this role is taken by the black race. At his Kean College speech, Khalid Mohammad had referred to the "Jew-nited Nations" in "Jew York City" and stated that the Jewish people deserved Hitler.

In 1991, the NOI published an anonymously authored book, The Secret Relationship Between Blacks and Jews; this book generated controversy for arguing that Jews had a disproportionately high level of involvement in the Atlantic slave trade.
David W. Leinweber of Emory University asserts that the Nation of Islam engages in revisionist and antisemitic interpretations of the Holocaust, and that they exaggerate the role of Jews in the trans-Atlantic slave trade.

Accusations of antisemitism have come from the Anti-Defamation League (ADL), a U.S.-based Jewish organization which has referred to Farrakhan as "Black Hitler." The ADL has engaged in surveillance of the Nation, anti-NOI political lobbying, and attempts to block its enterprises. Farrakhan has stated, "The ADL ... uses the term 'anti-Semitism' to stifle all criticism of Zionism and the Zionist policies of the State of Israel and also to stifle all legitimate criticism of the errant behavior of some Jewish people toward the non-Jewish population of the earth." Other Jewish groups have also been critical of the NOI; four Jewish organizations withdrew their sponsorship of the Parliament of World Religions when it invited Farrakhan to speak, while Jewish student groups have sought to prevent Farrakhan giving speeches on university campuses, picketing these speeches when they have occurred. Far-right Jewish groups have gone further; the Jewish Defense League organized a "Death to Farrakhan" march in 1985, while the Jewish Defense Organization was found to have Farrakhan as the top name on its list of individuals it sought to kill.

The NOI Health Minister Abdul Alim Muhammad accused Jewish doctors of injecting blacks with the AIDS virus; in 2020 Ishmael Muhammad claimed that Jewish people were receiving different vaccines for COVID-19 from other people.

Reception and influence 

The Nation of Islam became the largest black nationalist organization in the United States, having cultivated a sense of pride among many African Americans and made a noted effort to improve their education and welfare. At the start of the 21st century, Barrett called the NOI "one of the most visible and controversial black religions," while in the 1990s Gardell termed it the "most renowned and controversial" of the African American Muslim groups.

African American studies scholar, Priscilla McCutcheon noted that although the NOI remained a comparatively small religion, it had "a wide discursive reach", while in 1996 Gardell commented that its influence among black youth "far exceeds" its membership. The Nation's role in confronting gang violence, drugs, and poverty among African American communities has earned them respect. The sociologist A.A. Akom opined that the NOI had a reputation even among non-Muslim African Americans of "speaking truth to power," with a 1994 Time/CNN poll found that two-thirds of African Americans who knew of Farrakhan had favorable views of him. Similarly positive assessments of the Nation's efforts have been observed among black communities in Britain.

The Nation's teachings have influenced other groups, such as the Ansaaru Allah Community, which formed in 1970, and the Word of Faith movement, a type of Christianity which emerged in areas of the U.S. where the NOI had a pre-existing presence. The Nation has also influenced a range of hip hop and rap artists, including Public Enemy, Ice Cube, Kam, The Skinny Boys, Sister Souljah, and Prince Akeem, with various gangsta rap artists supporting the Nation.

The NOI has been the subject of much scholarly attention. Initial research was largely undertaken by historians and sociologists in the late 1950s and 1960s and was often hostile or dismissive; research influenced by disciplines like religious studies and gender studies followed later.
During the 20th century, most studies on the NOI relied on secondary sources due to the group's general unwillingness to open itself up to study. Those outside the movement have often seen its teachings as illogical and irrational. Various historical and scientific errors have been identified in the claims of its leaders; mainstream scientists, and much of the wider public, regard its mythological accounts as being pseudo-scientific.

Mainstream Islamic groups maintain that the Nation's members are not really Muslim. This is the view taken by groups like the Federation of Islamic Associations of the United States and Canada, which have distanced themselves from the Nation. The Ahmadiyya, an Islamic group whose legitimacy is also often rejected by mainstream Muslim communities, similarly does not recognise the NOI as Islamic. Elijah Muhammad dismissed these objections by claiming that the "Old Islam" of his critics was "led by white people", while Farrakhan has responded to such criticisms with his own critique of the mainstream Islamic world, accusing it of racism, of being obedient to the U.S. government, of engaging in sectarian violence, and of excessively relying on the hadith rather than the Quran. The Nation's views that white people lack inner divinity contrasts with the mainstream Islamic view that all humans are equal under God.

See also 

 List of organizations designated by the Southern Poverty Law Center as hate groups
 African American–Jewish relations
 African-American Muslims
 African diaspora religions
 Afrocentrism
 Islam in the African diaspora
 Islam in the United States
 List of topics related to the African diaspora
 Latino Muslims
 Nation of Gods and Earths, a black nationalist movement influenced by Islam which was founded in 1964
 Religion of black Americans
 United Nation of Islam, an offshoot of the Nation of Islam which was founded in 1978

References

Citations

Sources

Further reading

External links 

 Nation of Islam profile at the World Religion and Spirituality Project (WRSP)
 Messenger Elijah Muhammad Web Resources Center, Online books, audio, and video
 Nation of Islam-affiliated Final Call newspaper website
 Official Website of the United Kingdom Branch of the Nation of Islam
 Federal Bureau of Prisons Technical Reference Manual on Inmate Beliefs and Practices
 FBI file on the Nation of Islam

 
African-American-related controversies
Islam-related controversies in North America